This is a list of the deans of St Asaph Cathedral, Wales.

-1357 Llywelyn ap Madog
1357–1376 William Spridlington
1403 Richard Courtenay (afterwards Dean of Wells, 1410)
1455-1461 David Blodwell
1463-1492 John Tapton
1511-1542 Fouke Salisbury
1543-1556 Richard Puskyn
1556-c.1558 John Gruffith
c.1559 Maurice Blayne, alias Gruffith
1559 John Lloyd
1560-1587 Hugh Evans
1587-1634 Thomas Banks
1634-before 1654 Andrew Morris
1660-1663 David Lloyd
1663 Humphrey Lloyd
1674-1689 Nicholas Stratford
1689-1696 George Bright
1696-1706 Daniel Price
1706-1731 William Stanley
1731-1751 William Powell
1751-1774 William Herring
1774-1826 William Shipley
1826-1854 Charles Luxmoore
1854-1859 Charles Butler Clough
1859-1886 Richard B M Bonnor
1886-1889 Armitage James
1889-1892 John Owen
1892-1899 Watkin Williams
1899–1910 Shadrach Pryce
1910–1927 Llewelyn Wynne Jones
1927–1938 John Du Buisson
1938–1957 Spencer Ellis
1957–1971 Harold Charles
1971–1992 Raymond Renowden
1993–2001 Kerry Goulstone
2001-2011 Chris Potter
2011–Present Nigel Williams

References
british-history.ac.uk (13th century)
british-history.ac.uk (c.1300-c.1550)
:s:Page:Fasti ecclesiae Anglicanae Vol.1 body of work.djvu/123
:s:Page:Fasti ecclesiae Anglicanae Vol.1 body of work.djvu/124
:s:Page:Fasti ecclesiae Anglicanae Vol.1 body of work.djvu/125

Notes

Deans of St Asaph